Saint-Aignan, also unofficially Saint-Aignan-sur-Cher (literally Saint-Aignan on Cher) is a commune and town in the Loir-et-Cher department in the administrative region of Centre-Val de Loire, France.

Geography
Saint-Aignan is located on the river Cher, and is around 35 km (about 21,75 mi) south of Blois.

Population

Features
Saint-Aignan is known for its quiet nature, its gastronomic products, its castle and church and also its history. In the commune is located the ZooParc de Beauval.

See also

Communes of the Loir-et-Cher department

References

Communes of Loir-et-Cher
Dukes of Saint-Aignan
Berry, France